Spektral Quartet is a string quartet based in Chicago comprising Clara Lyon (violin), Theo Espy (violin), Doyle Armbrust (viola) and Russell Rolen (cello). It is the ensemble-in-residence at the University of Chicago's Department of Music, where it has served since 2012.

The New York Times said of a 2016 performance of Beat Furrer's String Quartet No. 3 and Hans Thomalla's Bagatellen for string quartet, "The quartet proved that they have everything: a supreme technical command that seems to come easily [and] a capacity to make complicated music clear..." Spektral Quartet says it "actively pursues a vivid conversation between exhilarating works of the traditional canon and those written this decade, this year, or this week."

History
The quartet's 2014 project Mobile Miniatures involved 47 composers, including Nico Muhly, David Lang, and Anna Thorvaldsdottir, who were commissioned to write ringtone-length pieces that were then recorded by Spektral Quartet and made available for download as ringtone, alarms, and text-message alerts on mobile devices.

The group recorded its debut album, Chambers (on Parlour Tapes+), in 2013 in collaboration with composers Hans Thomalla, Marcos Balter, LJ White, Chris Fisher-Lochhead, and Ben Hjertmann. Also in 2013, the group released From This Point Forward (on Azica Records), with bandoneon/accordion virtuoso Julien Labro and saxophone player Miguel Zenón. The band appeared on Swiss violin soloist Rachel Kolly d'Alba's 2015 record, Fin de siècle (Aparté), performing Ernest Chausson’s Concerto for Violin, Piano, and String Quartet and is featured on albums from composers Augusta Read Thomas and Ryan Ingebritsen.

In 2016, the group released Serious Business (on Sono Luminus), which was nominated for a 2017 Grammy Award. The album that explores humor in classical music through the compositional lenses of Josef Haydn, Sky Macklay, Chris Fisher-Lochhead, and David Reminick. The Strad magazine said of the album, "these are superb performances, vivid and strongly felt, convincingly argued and full of rich, characterful detail." The Spektral Quartet created the Feldman Forward Initiative to help raise money for GirlForward, an organization that assist refugee girls who have resettled in Chicago, Illinois and in Austin, Texas, and challenged attendees at its Chicago premiere of Morton Feldman’s Quartet No. 2 on March 11 by promising for every man who stayed for the entirety of five-hours a donation in his name would be made.

In 2019, Nathalie Joachim's album Fanm d'Ayiti, which featured the group, was nominated for the Grammy Award for Best World Music Album.

Albums 
 Chambers (2013) Parlour Tapes+
 From This Point Forward (2013) Azica Records
 with Julien Labro (bandoneon/accordion)
 with special guest Miguel Zenón
 Serious Business (2016) Sono Luminus

Albums featuring Spektral Quartet 
 Fin de siècle (2015) Aparté
 Of Being is a Bird (2016) Nimbus Records
 Fanm d'Ayiti (2019) New Amsterdam Records

Articles and reviews 
 Chicago Reader: Spektral Quartet give difficult music a friendly face (Jan 20, 2016)
 New York Times: Review: Frequency Festival Offers in Chicago Offers the Complicated and Compelling (Mar 1, 2016)
 Boston Globe: For Spektral Quartet, modern music mixes well with humor (Mar 11, 2016)
 WQXR Q2 Music: Humor and Fiendish Difficulty in Spektral Quartet's 'Serious Business' (Jan 18, 2016)
 WQXR Q2 Music: 10 Imagination-Grabbing, Trailblazing Artists of 2014 (Dec 15, 2014)
 Pitchfork: Mobile Miniatures: Download Ringtones Composed by Nico Muhly, Julia Holter, Dirty Projectors' Olga Bell, and More (May 13, 2014)
 Chicago Tribune: Spektral Quartet dials up micro-symphonies for cellphone (Nov 26, 2013)

References

American string quartets
Musical groups established in 2010
2010 establishments in Illinois